Gen. Jacob Brown Mansion is a historic home located at Brownville in Jefferson County, New York.  It is a stone house built about 1811.

It was listed on the National Register of Historic Places in 1980.

See also
General Jacob Jennings Brown
Brownville, New York
National Register of Historic Places listings in Jefferson County, New York

References

Houses on the National Register of Historic Places in New York (state)
Houses completed in 1811
Houses in Jefferson County, New York
National Register of Historic Places in Jefferson County, New York